This is a list of Danish television related events from 1985.

Events
9 March - Hot Eyes are selected to represent Denmark at the 1985 Eurovision Song Contest with their song "Sku' du spørg' fra no'en?". They are selected to be the eighteenth Danish Eurovision entry during Dansk Melodi Grand Prix held at the DR Studios in Copenhagen.

Debuts

Television shows

Births
7 March - Christopher Læssø, actor & TV host
28 May - Ena Spottag, actress

See also
1985 in Denmark

Deaths